Mark Diemers (born 11 October 1993) is a Dutch professional footballer who plays as a midfielder for FC Emmen, on loan from Feyenoord.

Club career
Diemers formerly played for FC Utrecht and SC Cambuur and moved to De Graafschap on loan in January 2016. In May 2016 he joined the club on a permanent basis.

On 11 June 2018, he signed a three-year contract with Fortuna Sittard, newly promoted to the Eredivisie.

On 19 June 2020, Feyenoord announced that Diemers had signed a three-year contract with the club. He joined the club at the start of the 2020–21 season. He was loaned out to 2. Bundesliga club Hannover 96 for the second half of the 2021–22 season.

On 11 August 2022, Diemers joined FC Emmen on a season-long loan.

References

External links
 Voetbal International profile 

1993 births
Living people
Footballers from Leeuwarden
Association football midfielders
Dutch footballers
FC Utrecht players
SC Cambuur players
De Graafschap players
Fortuna Sittard players
Feyenoord players
Hannover 96 players
FC Emmen players
Eredivisie players
Eerste Divisie players
2. Bundesliga players
Dutch expatriate footballers
Expatriate footballers in Germany
Dutch expatriate sportspeople in Germany